{{Infobox anthem
|title = ئەی ڕەقیب
|transcription = Ey Reqîb
|english_title = 'O Enemy!'
|image =
|image_size = 
|caption = Flag of Kurdistan
|prefix = Regional
|country =the 

Former national anthem of 
|author = Dildar
|lyrics_date = 1938
|composer =
|music_date =
|adopted = 1946 (by Mahabad)1991 (by Kurdistan Region)
|until = 1946 (by Mahabad)
|sound = ئەی ڕەقیب - تاكا بك.ogg
|sound_title =
}}

"'''" is the Kurdish national anthem and the official anthem of the autonomous Kurdistan Region of Iraq. The poem was written in 1938 by Dildar in Sorani.

History
It was written by the Kurdish poet and political activist Dildar in 1938 while he was in jail. "Ey Reqîb" means "O Enemy!" and refers to the guards in the prison in which Dildar was held and tortured but also to the broader oppression of Kurds.

In 1946, the poem was adopted as the national anthem of the Kurdistan Republic of Mahabad, a short-lived Kurdish republic in Iran that lasted for a year. "Ey Reqîb" has been adopted as the national anthem of Kurdistan Region, and it is also used by Kurdistan Workers' Party.

Official lyrics

Soranî Kurdish

Lyrics in other dialects

Northern Kurdish (Kurmancî)

Southern Kurdish

Zazakî

Translations

References

External links

 performed by Kenwood Symphony Orchestra.

Kurdish literature
Patriotic songs
Republic of Mahabad
1938 songs
Asian anthems
Regional songs
National anthem compositions in F major
National anthem compositions in G major